The Heliastic oath (heliastikos horkos)  was an oath sworn by jurors in the ancient Athenian law courts.

In Demosthenes' speech Against Timocrates, the oath was quoted, and using quotations from other speeches, we can reconstruct the oath's main lines. The oath was sworn in the names of Zeus, Apollo, and Demeter. At the end of the oath, the juror said a curse against himself if he should break his oath. Voting in the court was secret though, so a juror could not be accused of breaking the oath. However, the juror could experience divine punishment for breaking the oath.

Oath
"I will cast my vote in consonance with the laws and with the decrees passed by the Assembly and by the Council, but, if there is no law, in consonance with my sense of what is most just, without favour or enmity. I will vote only on the matters raised in the charge, and I will listen impartially to accusers and defenders alike."

German philologist Max Fränkel (1846 - 1903) reconstructed the entire oath as follows: 
"I will vote according to the laws and the votes of the Demos of Athenians and the Council of the Five Hundred, and concerning matters about which there are no laws by the most just understanding, and for the sake of neither favour nor enmity. And I will vote concerning the very matters about which the prosecution is, and I will listen to both the accusers and defendants, both of them equally. I swear these things by Zeus, Apollo, and Demeter, and may I have many good things if I swear well, but destruction for me and my family if I forswear."

See also
 Bouleutic oath
 Heliaia

References

Ancient Greek law
Athenian democracy
Oaths